Irene Montrucchio Beaus (born 7 October 1991) is a Spanish competitor in synchronized swimming. She won a bronze medal in team competition at the 2012 Summer Olympics.

Notes

References

External links 
 
 
 

1991 births
Living people
Spanish synchronized swimmers
Olympic synchronized swimmers of Spain
Olympic medalists in synchronized swimming
Olympic bronze medalists for Spain
Synchronized swimmers at the 2012 Summer Olympics
Medalists at the 2012 Summer Olympics
World Aquatics Championships medalists in synchronised swimming
Synchronized swimmers at the 2011 World Aquatics Championships
Synchronized swimmers at the 2013 World Aquatics Championships